Ethylene Copolymer Bitumen (ECB) is a black-colored mixture based on high quality polyethylene copolymers with different proportions of various special and amorphous bitumen grades.

The ECB membrane (used for waterproofing) was invented in 1968.

Notes

References

Copolymers